General Wagner may refer to:

Arthur L. Wagner (1853–1905), U.S. Army brigadier general
Eduard Wagner (1894–1944), German Wehrmacht general
George D. Wagner (1829–1869), Union Army brigadier general
Gustav Wagner (Wehrmacht) (1890–1951), German Wehrmacht major general
Hans Wagner (general) (1896–1967), German Wehrmacht lieutenant general
Herbert Wagner (general) (1896–1968), German Wehrmacht lieutenant general
Jürgen Wagner (1901–1947), German Waffen-SS general
Kurt Wagner (general) (1904–1989), German National People's Army colonel general
Louis C. Wagner Jr. (born 1932), U.S. Army four-star general

See also
Carl Wagener (1901–1988), German Wehrmacht major general
Otto Wagener (1888–1971), German Wehrmacht major general